Sri Kanchi Kamakshi is a 1978 Indian Tamil-language Hindu devotional film on the Goddess Kamakshi. The movie is told in a narrative style by the characters played by Major Sundarrajan. Lead roles in the film are played by S.A. Ashokan, Gemini Ganesan, R. Muthuraman, P. R. Varalakshmi, Rajasulochana, Thengai Srinivasan, Srividya, Sujatha, Vanisri and K.R. Vijaya. The film was released on 30 October 1978.

Plot 

The story follows the birth of Meenakshimyndan and then narrates the exploits of Goddess Kamakshi with Meenakshimyndan as the narrator.

Cast 
 A. V. M. Rajan as Lord Shiva
 Major Sundarrajan as Meenakshimyndan
 Ennathe Kannaiah as Villager
 Gemini Ganesan as Meenakshimyndan's father
 R. Muthuraman as Adi shankara
 Thengai Srinivasan as An ardent devotee
 S.A. Ashokan as Kabaligan
 Sujatha as Meenakshimyndan's mother
 Srikanth
 P. R. Varalakshmi
 Rajasulochana
 Srividya
 Vanisri
 Sripriya as Meenakshi
 Prameela
 Y. Vijaya
 J. Lalitha as Maragadham Mother / Arupa Lakshmi
 Vadivukkarasi
 K. Kannan as Bhandasura
 Tambaram Lalitha as Kali

References

External links 
 

1970s Tamil-language films
Films directed by K. S. Gopalakrishnan
Films with screenplays by K. S. Gopalakrishnan
Hindu devotional films